Allauddin Khan, also known as Baba Allauddin Khan ( – 6 September 1972) was an Indian sarod player and multi-instrumentalist, composer and one of the most notable music teachers of the 20th century in Indian classical music. For a generation many of his students, across different instruments like sitar and violin, dominated Hindustani classical and became some of the most famous exponents of the form ever, including Ravi Shankar and Ali Akbar Khan.

Early life
Khan was born in Shibpur village in Brahmanbaria (in present-day Bangladesh). His father, Sabdar Hossain Khan, was a musician. Khan took his first music lessons from his elder brother, Fakir Aftabuddin Khan. At age ten, Khan ran away from home to join a jatra party where he was exposed to a variety of folk genres: jari, sari, baul, bhatiyali, kirtan, and panchali.

Khan went to Kolkata, where he met a physician named Kedarnath, who helped him to become a disciple of Gopal Krishna Bhattacharya (also known as Nulo Gopal), a notable musician of Kolkata in 1877. Khan practiced sargam for twelve years under his guidance. After the death of Nulo Gopal, Khan turned to instrumental music. He learned to play many indigenous and foreign musical instruments like sitar, flute, piccolo, mandolin, banjo, etc., from Amritalal Dutt, a cousin of Swami Vivekananda and the music director of the Star Theatre. He learnt to play sanai, naquara, tiquara and jagajhampa from Hazari Ustad and pakhawaj, mridang and tabla from Nandababu.

Ali Ahmed referred Allauddin to veena player Wazir Khan.

Career

Khan became court musician for the Maharaja of Maihar. Here he laid the foundation of a modern Maihar gharana by developing a number of ragas, combining the bass sitar and bass sarod with more traditional instruments and setting up an orchestra. Before becoming court musician he had come to Maihar and met one Suraj Sahai Saxena in a penniless  state. Taking pity on him Suraj Sahai  took him in his shelter where lived two odd years and practised music with Shehnai . When Suraj Sahai used to visit Sharda Devi temple in Maihar climbing all the 552 steps, Allauddin Khan used to accompany him and practice Shehnai  outside temple precincts . Suraj Sahai had a cousin named Chimmanlal Saxena who was diwan of Maharaja of Maihar.  In 1907, Allauddin khan established the Maihar Band, an orchestral group that was taught music to orphaned children. On recommendation of Chimmanlal , he was appointed as court musician of Maharaja of Maihar . In 1935, he toured Europe, along with Uday Shankar's ballet troupe, and later also worked at his institute, Uday Shankar India Culture Centre at Almora for a while. In 1955, Khan established a college of music in Maihar. Some of his recordings are made at the All India Radio in 1959–60.

Awards
Khan was awarded the Padma Bhushan in 1958 and the Padma Vibhushan in 1971, India's third and second highest civilian honours, and prior to that in 1954, the Sangeet Natak Akademi awarded him with its highest honour, the Sangeet Natak Akademi Fellowship for lifetime contribution to Indian music.

Legacy

Khan's son Ali Akbar Khan, daughter Annapurna Devi, nephew Raja Hossain Khan and grandson Aashish Khan went on to become musicians. His other disciples include Ravi Shankar, Nikhil Banerjee, V.G. Jog, Vasant Rai, Shripad Bandopdhyay, Pannalal Ghosh, Bahadur Khan, Rabin Ghosh, Sharan Rani, Nalin Mazumdar, Jotin Bhattacharya, Rajesh Chandra Moitra, David Podiappuhami aka Siyambalapitiyage Don David Podiappuhami [] and W. D. Amaradeva.

Khan's house was in Maihar. This house has been restored by Ambica Beri as part of a development that includes an artists and a writers retreat nearby.

Personal life
Anecdotes about Khan range from throwing a tabla tuning hammer at the Maharaja himself to taking care of disabled beggars. Nikhil Banerjee said that the tough image was "deliberately projected in order not to allow any liberty to the disciple. He was always worried that soft treatment on his part would only spoil them".

Films
 Ustad Alauddin Khan (1963), a documentary directed by Ritwik Ghatak.
 Baba Alauddin Khan (1965), a documentary by Indian film director Harisadhan Dasgupta.
  Raga (1971), directed by Howard Worth. Remastered version released in 2010 by East Meets West Music.
 Maihar Raag (1993), directed by Sunil Shanbag. A look at Allauddin Khan's crumbling heritage in Maihar, which won the National Film Award for Best Non-Feature Film in 1994.

References

Further reading

External links
 
 Ustad Baba Allaudin Khan, Detailed Biography and images at California Institute of the Arts
 Raga (2010 Remaster) at East Meets West Music
 

1862 births
1972 deaths
People from Brahmanbaria district
Sitar players
Veena players
19th-century Indian composers
20th-century Indian composers
Bengali musicians
Hindustani composers
Hindustani instrumentalists
Indian classical composers
Indian male composers
Indian music educators
Indian multi-instrumentalists
Maihar gharana
Recipients of the Padma Bhushan in arts
Recipients of the Padma Vibhushan in arts
Recipients of the Sangeet Natak Akademi Award
Recipients of the Sangeet Natak Akademi Fellowship
Date of birth missing
20th-century male musicians
19th-century male musicians